Haitham al-Maleh (born August 15, 1931) is a Syrian human rights activist and former judge. He is a critic of the current Syrian government under Bashar al-Assad and has been imprisoned by the Syrian government because he was calling for constitutional reforms. Maleh became an important opposition figure in the Syrian Civil War.

Background 
Born in Sarouja, Damascus, Haitham al-Maleh earned a degree in law and a diploma in international law from the Damascus University. He was first arrested in 1951 at the age of twenty when he called for an independent judiciary; he was imprisoned for three weeks. He became a judge in 1958. The first Baathist government dismissed him from the judicial bench because of his public criticism of the 1963 Emergency Law, which suspended constitutional rights and codified martial law. He returned to the practice of law after his dismissal.

While originally an advocate for democratic reforms, by the early 1970s, Maleh became an outspoken critic of the situation in Syria. The Syrian government ordered Maleh's arrest and detention numerous times because of his political activities. In 1978. Maleh was jailed as a political prisoner between 1980 and 1986 because he publicly criticized the Syrian government's lack of commitment to repeal the Emergency Law and suppression of the Muslim Brotherhood in Syria, culminating in the quelling of the group in 1982. He went on hunger strikes at least twice during his detention.

Maleh, human rights activists found common ground and started the Human Rights Association in Syria in July 2001, and he was elected president of the organization, a position he held until 2006. He has been active in Amnesty International since 1989.

Maleh wrote several times to Syrian President Bashar al-Assad criticizing the human rights violation in the country. Writing as the president of the Syrian Human Rights Association, he demanded the lifting of the Emergency Law. In 2003, he spoke before the German Parliament on the issue of Syrian human rights, describing al-Assad's rule as "a fascist dictatorship". When he returned, the Syrian government banned him from leaving the country for the next seven years.

He has received awards for his defence of human rights in Syria, including the Dutch Human Rights Prize awarded to him in 2006. The Syrian Government refused to allow him to leave the country to receive the award in the Netherlands. After weeks of uncertainty he learned of the final refusal to grant him an exit visa only the day before the ceremony. In 2004 Maleh received the French National Consultative Commission of Human Rights "Human Rights Honor Award" for his research on torture in Syria, and the annual award for the dignity of the Geneva Human Rights Defenders in 2010, in addition to other awards and honors.

2009 arrest
Maleh's most recent arrest was on 14 October 2009, a day after giving an interview on 'Panorama', a political analysis show on Barada TV, a London-based satellite channel associated with the Syrian opposition and allegedly funded by the U.S. government. He was referred to the Damascus military court and tried on charges of spreading false and misleading information that would "affect the morale of the nation", and sentenced to three years prison. Amnesty International named him a prisoner of conscience, "detained solely for the peaceful exercise of his right to freedom of expression", and called for his immediate release.

He was released on 8 March 2011 after a presidential amnesty on the anniversary of the arrival of the Baath party ascension to power, which was extended only to prisoners over 70 years old.

Maleh requested Syrian authorities to cease political detention permanently, release all political prisoners, and affirm the right of every Syrian citizen to express his opinion. He noted that political prisoners are those who voice their opinions, and are not advocates of violence.

Syrian Civil War
In an interview with The Daily Telegraph on 30 January 2012, Maleh stated that the situation in Syria had passed the point where peaceful resolution was possible and stated that "Assad and his family will be killed in Syria...the end for them will be that they are killed like Gaddafi."

See also
Kamal al-Labwani
Aref Dalila
Damascus Spring

References

External links
 Haitham Maleh Foundation

1931 births
People from Damascus
Damascus University alumni
Amnesty International prisoners of conscience held by Syria
Syrian human rights activists
Living people
Syrian democracy activists
Syrian dissidents
Syrian prisoners and detainees